Ternary (from Latin ternarius) or trinary is an adjective meaning "composed of three items". It can refer to:

Mathematics and logic 
 Ternary numeral system, a base-3 counting system
 Balanced ternary, a positional numeral system, useful for comparison logic
 Ternary logic, a logic system with the values true, false, and some other value
 Ternary plot or ternary graph, a plot that shows the ratios of three proportions
 Ternary relation, a finitary relation in which the number of places in the relation is three
 Ternary operation, an operation that takes three parameters
 Ternary function, a function that takes three arguments

Computing 
 Ternary signal, a signal that can assume three significant values
 Ternary computer, a computer using a ternary numeral system
 Ternary tree, a tree data structure in computer science
Ternary search tree, a ternary (three-way) tree data structure of strings
 Ternary search, a computer science technique for finding the minimum or maximum of a function
 Ternary heap, a data structure in computer science
 Ternary Golay code, a perfect [11, 6, 5] ternary linear code
 ?:, a ternary conditional operator used for basic conditional expressions in several programming languages

Other uses 
 Ternary complex, a complex formed by the interaction of three molecules
 Ternary compound, a type of chemical compound
 Ternary form, a form used for structuring music
 Ternary name for any taxon below the rank of species

See also
 Tertiary (disambiguation)
 Binary (disambiguation)
 Quaternary (disambiguation)